The Fitch Cemetery, located west of Eureka, Utah, United States, was established in 1920 and was listed on the National Register of Historic Places in 1979.

Description
The cemetery is a private cemetery, which is not typically eligible for National Register listing.  But the 1977 nomination asserts that "the Fitch burial area represents a most unique factor in U. S. mining history; namely, the fact that an entrepreneurial family not only lived in the locale of their mine but also are buried there. In fact, in 1975 a member died in New York, and the remains were flown to Utah for interment at the family cemetery."

The cemetery includes a headstone for Walter Fitch (1854-1937) and Exilda Fitch (1857-1948).

It is located on just off U.S. Route 6, but is more easily accessed by heading north off Utah State Route 36.

See also

 National Register of Historic Places listings in Juab County, Utah
 Eureka City Cemetery (Utah), Eureka's nearby cemetery that is also listed on the NRHP

References

External links

Cemeteries in Utah
National Register of Historic Places in Juab County, Utah
Cemeteries on the National Register of Historic Places in Utah
Buildings and structures completed in 1920